The Andhra Pradesh Legislative Assembly or Andhra Pradesh Śāsana Sabha is the lower house of the bicameral legislature of the Indian state, Andhra Pradesh.

The Legislative Assembly consists of 175 members which are elected by adult universal suffrage under the first-past-the-post system. The duration of the Assembly is five years from the date appointed for its first meeting, unless it is decided to dissolve the Assembly sooner. The Legislative Assembly's main functions include legislation, overseeing of administration, passing the budget, and airing public grievances.

The Legislative Assembly holds three sessions annually, one for Budget and other for Monsoon and Winter sessions.

The Legislative Assembly took up residence in the interim Legislative Assembly Building in Amaravati beginning from the 2016 Budget session. The new building has systems for automatic speech translation and automatic vote recording.

History 
The Andhra Legislative Assembly was constituted after the formation of Andhra State on 1 October 1953. When Andhra Pradesh was formed on 1 November 1956 by merging Andhra State with the Telugu speaking areas of Hyderabad State, the 140 Members of Andhra State Legislative Assembly and 105 Members representing the Telugu speaking areas of Hyderabad State merged to form APLA. At the time of formation, the Legislature was unicameral with only an Assembly with 301 Members. The first meeting was held on 3 December 1956. Sri Ayyadevara Kaleswara Rao and Sri Konda Lakshman Bapuji were the first Speaker and the first Deputy Speaker, respectively.

With the formation of the Legislative Council on 1 July 1958, the Andhra Pradesh Legislature became Bicameral and remained so until 1 June 1985 when the Legislative Council was dissolved on 31 May 1985 during the period of Eighth Legislative Assembly and the State Legislature once again became unicameral.

On 2 June 2014, the state of Andhra Pradesh was split to form the new state of Telangana. Andhra Pradesh was allocated 175 legislative seats with the remaining 119 allocated to Telangana Legislative Assembly.

The recent elections to the legislative assembly were taken placeAssembly on 11 April 2019. The YSR Congress Party winning a total of 151 seats and the ruling Telugu Desam Party restricting itself to 23 seats and Jana Sena Party with 1 seat.

Composition 
The current assembly is the Fifteenth Legislative Assembly of Andhra Pradesh.

Presiding officers

Members

Election results

United Andhra Pradesh

Andhra Pradesh

Members of Legislative Assembly

See also 

 Andhra Pradesh Legislative Council
 Andhra Pradesh Legislature
 List of Assembly constituencies of Andhra Pradesh
List of governors of Andhra Pradesh
 List of chief ministers of Andhra Pradesh
 List of deputy chief ministers of Andhra Pradesh

References 

 
State lower houses in India